Ambient 3: Day of Radiance (1980) is an album by the American ambient musician Laraaji (alias Edward Larry Gordon), which was produced by Brian Eno.

Overview
This album is the third entry of Eno’s Ambient series, which began in 1978 with Music for Airports, and was preceded by The Plateaux of Mirror. The series ended with On Land.

Compared to the rest of the series, Day of Radiance features very little in the way of electronics. Laraaji uses a variety of acoustic stringed instruments such as a hammered dulcimer and 36-stringed open-tuned zither.

Track listing
All tracks by Laraaji

”The Dance #1” – 9:06
”The Dance #2” – 9:39
”The Dance #3” – 3:15
”Meditation #1” – 18:42
”Meditation #2” – 7:50

Content
The first three tracks are variations on a theme named "The Dance", and are delivered in a fast, hypnotic, Gamelan-like, rhythmic pace on a hammered dulcimer. Eno's input is not only in the role of producer; he also adds many creative touches to the natural instrument-sounds. In particular, he "layers" the tracks, after which he applies various effects to the point at which the dulcimer almost sounds like other instruments.

These processes are particularly noticeable on the last of the "Dance" pieces. The simple practice of slowing the tape down creates resonances that are deep, and distorted in places.

The final two tracks ("Meditation 1 & 2") are different; more in keeping with the "ambient" style featured on the rest of the series. These are slow, meandering beatless compositions performed on the zither, with the dulcimer adding the odd highlight. Eno's tactic in these two pieces is mainly to electronically highlight the zither's naturally long decay-rate, creating a highly ethereal sound.

Personnel and instruments 
 Cover art and production – Brian Eno
 Music – Laraaji
 Instruments – treated and amplified zither; hammered dulcimer

Versions

References

External links
 Interview; 2002
 Stylus article on the Ambient series
 Discogs.com entry
 dwij entry
 Japanese ambient dub quartet Audio Active have remixed a selection of the material for their album The Way Out Is The Way In, Gyroscope/Caroline GYR 6615-2, 1995 (Discogs.com)

Laraaji albums
1980 albums
Albums produced by Brian Eno
E.G. Records albums